Bierné-les-Villages (literally Bierné the Villages) is a commune in the Mayenne department in northwestern France. It was established on 1 January 2019 by merger of the former communes of Bierné (the seat), Argenton-Notre-Dame, Saint-Laurent-des-Mortiers and Saint-Michel-de-Feins.

See also
Communes of the Mayenne department

References

Communes of Mayenne